The Treaty of Union was a treaty that led to the creation of the United Belgian States, a confederal republic of territories of the Austrian Netherlands that were in revolt against Emperor Joseph II of Austria during the Brabant Revolution (1789–1790). The Duchy of Luxemburg did not sign or ratify the treaty, and therefore never became a part of the United Belgian States.

See also
 Brabant Revolution
 Committee of United Belgians and Liégeois
 Manifesto of the People of Brabant
 Manifesto of the Province of Flanders

References

External links

 Text of the Treaty 
 Text of the Treaty 

United Belgian States
1790 treaties